National Highway 4, or NH 4, is the major highway in the Indian union territory of Andaman and Nicobar Islands. It is 230.7 km in length. This road running from the capital city of Port Blair to Diglipur connecting all major towns of Ferrargunj, Baratang, Kadamtala, Rangat, Billy Ground, Nimbudera, Mayabunder and Diglipur. This highway is known as the Andaman Trunk Road (The Great Andaman Trunk Road).

ATR has become a lifeline for the people of the Andaman group of islands, especially for those residing in the North & Middle Andaman district. Because prior 1970s to early 1990s transportation of men and goods used to take several days by sea route now can be completed in a matter of 10–12 hours. NH-4 hence facilitates easy movement of essential commodities, health care facilities, etc. year-round.

ATR passes through the buffer zone of the Jarwa Reserve between Jirkatang to the Middle Strait where laws are in place to minimize traveler contact with the native tribe of Jarawa. Only vehicle convoys with armed escorts are allowed.

This highway is currently undergoing a major upgrade and construction of two major bridges under NHIDCL of ₹ 1511.22 crores.

Earlier this stretch of highway was numbered as NH-223.

A stretch of national highway from Mumbai to Pune to Hubli to Bangalore to Chennai was earlier called NH 4 before renumbering of national highways in 2010. The former NH 4 is now renumbered as NH 48.

See also
 List of National Highways in India (by Highway Number)
 List of National Highways in India
 National Highways Development Project

References

External links

NH 4 on OpenStreetMap

National highways in India
Transport in the Andaman and Nicobar Islands